Ahmad Khvajeh (also Romanized as Aḩmad Khvājeh) is a village in Milas Rural District, in the Central District of Lordegan County, Chaharmahal and Bakhtiari Province, Iran. At the 2006 census, its population was 77, in 15 families.

References 

Populated places in Lordegan County